The HA. 19 (also known as Japanese Midget Submarine "C" by the US Navy) is a historic Imperial Japanese Navy  midget submarine that was part of the Japanese attack on Pearl Harbor on 7 December 1941.  The submarine's crew was ordered to enter Pearl Harbor, attack the moored American warships with its two torpedoes and then scuttle her with explosives.  However, the crew was unable to enter the harbor due to navigational difficulties, and the submarine ran aground and was captured by American forces.

HA. 19 is now displayed at the National Museum of the Pacific War in Fredericksburg, Texas.

Build
HA. 19 was built at Kure Naval Dockyard, Kure, Hiroshima, Japan as a Type A Kō-hyōteki-class midget submarine in 1938. The Type 92 periscope was installed later in May 1941.

Pearl Harbor

In November 1941, HA. 19 was part of the Kido Butai, carried by the Type C cruiser submarine I-24, its mother ship, from the Kamegakubi Naval Proving Ground. Its two-man crew consisted of Ensign Kazuo Sakamaki and CWO Kiyoshi Inagaki.

At 03:30 on 7 December 1941, HA. 19 was launched from I-24 with a broken gyrocompass. The crew had four-and-a-half hours to reach Pearl Harbor, and attempted to fix the compass en route.

HA. 19 approached the harbor entrance, but impaired by the malfunctioning compass, she hit a reef three times and grounded on the right side of the entrance at 08:00. Inagaki dived the submarine, and when he resurfaced at 08:19, the destroyer spotted her again and fired, missing but blasting HA. 19 off the reef, knocking Sakamaki unconscious. Inagaki dived once more to escape.

When Sakamaki regained consciousness, the crew made another attempt to enter the harbor. The grounding had damaged the vessel so she could not fire one of her torpedoes. HA. 19 was slowly flooding and the batteries were giving off fumes from being in contact with seawater. Attempting to enter the harbor they hit the reef again and reversed for another attempt. On the next try, she grounded again, but came free after adjusting the ballast. On the final attempt, HA. 19 was depth charged, which disabled her ability to fire the other torpedo and damaged the periscope. 

The crew decided to abort the attack and return to I-24 near Lanai. The fumes given off by the batteries finally overcame them and HA. 19 was  carried by the currents. The crew awoke to find it was night, and they planned to beach the submarine at Waimānalo. The engine died and she grounded on an offshore reef. Sakamaki ordered Inagaki to abandon ship while he set the explosive scuttling charge and followed suit. The charge failed to detonate, likely from being immersed in seawater. Sakamaki managed to swim through the surf to shore where he collapsed and was captured the next day; however, Inagaki drowned and his body washed ashore the next day.

Capture

HA. 19 was given the American designation of "Midget C", the third letter of the alphabet, being the third midget submarine spotted by American forces.  On 8 December 1941, the abandoned HA. 19 was bombed by U.S. Army aircraft. The bombs missed and she broke free and washed on to the beach.  In the days following the attack she was pulled out of the sea with the aid of an Army tractor.  HA. 19 was built to be disassembled into three parts, and this characteristic was utilized to dismantle her without destroying the vessel.  She was transported to the Naval Submarine Base Pearl Harbor and examined, yielding technical data and various documents.  It was determined that most of the damage to HA. 19 was a result of the multiple groundings.

Exhibit

HA. 19 was sent to the U.S. mainland in September (Navy Photograph 8/29/42) 1942 where she went on war bond tours. She was at Navy Pier, Chicago, Illinois when the war ended.

On 20 January 1947, HA. 19 was put on outdoor display at Naval Station Key West, Key West, Florida. On 2 December 1964, she was loaned to the Key West Art and Historical Association and moved to an outdoor exhibit at the Key West Lighthouse and Military Museum adjacent to Key West Light. On 30 June 1989, HA. 19 was listed on the U.S. National Register of Historic Places, and was declared a U.S. National Historic Landmark.

In 1990, the association administering the Key West museum decided to transition their facility to a strictly lighthouse museum and began divesting itself of its military collections.  In 1991, HA. 19 was moved to Fredericksburg, Texas to become part of the National Museum of the Pacific War at the Admiral Nimitz State Historic Site.  That same year, Sakamaki attended a historical conference at the museum and was reunited with his submarine.

See also

Ha. 62-76 Japanese Midget Attack Submarine, surrendered in Guam
List of U.S. National Historic Landmark ships, shipwrecks, and shipyards
List of National Historic Landmarks in Texas
National Register of Historic Places listings in Gillespie County, Texas
Recorded Texas Historic Landmarks in Gillespie County

References

Sources

External links

 
 HNSA Web Page: USS HA-19
 Japanese Navy Ships -- Ha-19 (Midget Submarine, 1938-1941)  at The Naval Historical Center
Japan's War in Colour, captured sub in surf, during 31:08-45
 Monroe County (Florida) listings at National Register of Historic Places
 USS Helm, Report of Pearl Harbor Attack 

Buildings and structures in Fredericksburg, Texas
Type A Ko-hyoteki-class submarines
Military history of Japan during World War II
National Historic Landmarks in Texas
National Register of Historic Places in Gillespie County, Texas
Museum ships in Texas
World War II submarines of Japan
Ships on the National Register of Historic Places in Texas
Museums in Gillespie County, Texas
1938 ships
Military and war museums in Texas
Japanese submarines lost during World War II
World War II on the National Register of Historic Places
Maritime incidents in December 1941
World War II shipwrecks in the Pacific Ocean
Shipwrecks of Hawaii
Naval ships captured by the United States during World War II
Attack on Pearl Harbor
Ships built by Kure Naval Arsenal